Dayin is a town in Xushui County in central Hebei province, China, located  southeast of the county seat, opposite G4 Beijing–Hong Kong and Macau Expressway, and around twice that north-northeast of downtown Baoding. , it has 25 villages under its administration.

See also 
 List of township-level divisions of Hebei

References 

Township-level divisions of Hebei